Tara Strohmeier is a retired actress who appeared in memorable B-movies in the 1970s, many of them made for drive-in theater business and have since acquired large cult followings.

Her biggest roles were in The Great Texas Dynamite Chase (1976), as the sister of the late Claudia Jennings, and Van Nuys Boulevard (1979) playing a sexy car-hop, "Wanda", who falls in love with a hot-rodder named "Chooch" (played by David Hayward).

She also played "Jill McBain" in Joe Dante's Hollywood Boulevard (1976), and appeared in three films by Jonathan Kaplan: The Student Teachers (1973), Truck Turner (1974) and 11th Victim (1979). Her other film credits include Dirty O'Neil (1974), Candy Stripe Nurses (1974), Cover Girl Models (1975), the John Landis cult-comedy The Kentucky Fried Movie (1977), and Malibu Beach (1978).

Retired from acting, Tara lives in Orange County, California with her two sons.

References

External links
 

Living people
American film actresses
20th-century American actresses
Year of birth missing (living people)
21st-century American women